John Lofting (1659 – 15 June 1742, London), originally Jan Loftingh, was an engineer and entrepreneur from the Netherlands.

Biography
His parents were Herman and Johanna. He moved to London, England, before 1686. He patented two inventions: the "sucking worm engine" (a fire engine) and a horse-powered thimble knurling machine. His mill was set up in Islington, where Lofting Road is named after him. However, in or about 1700, he moved his main operation to Great Marlow in Buckinghamshire to take advantage of the River Thames' ability to turn a water wheel which improved productivity, enabling the production of over 2 million thimbles per year.

References

1659 births
1742 deaths
Dutch engineers
History of firefighting
English inventors